Thomas Bourgeois is a Paralympic athlete from America competing mainly in category P44 pentathlon events.	
	
He won a bronze medal at the 1992 Summer Paralympics in Barcelona, Spain in the men's Pentathlon - PS4 event. At the 1996 Summer Paralympics in Atlanta, United States, he won a silver medal in the men's Pentathlon - P44 event, a bronze medal in the men's 4 x 100 meter relay - T42-46 event, and finished seventh in the men's 800 meters - F43-44 event.  At the 2000 Summer Paralympics in Sydney, Australia, he won a silver medal in the men's Pentathlon - P44 event.

References

External links
 

Paralympic track and field athletes of the United States
Athletes (track and field) at the 1992 Summer Paralympics
Athletes (track and field) at the 1996 Summer Paralympics
Athletes (track and field) at the 2000 Summer Paralympics
Paralympic silver medalists for the United States
Paralympic bronze medalists for the United States
Living people
American male sprinters
American male discus throwers
American pentathletes
Medalists at the 1992 Summer Paralympics
Medalists at the 1996 Summer Paralympics
Medalists at the 2000 Summer Paralympics
Year of birth missing (living people)
Paralympic medalists in athletics (track and field)
Sprinters with limb difference
Discus throwers with limb difference
Paralympic sprinters
Paralympic discus throwers